The North Cambridge carhouse is a bus garage for trolleybuses, and a former streetcar carhouse, in Cambridge, Massachusetts, which is owned and operated by the Massachusetts Bay Transportation Authority (MBTA).  It was first built in 1874. The current structure dates from 1979 and is located in the North Cambridge neighborhood at 2375 Massachusetts Avenue. It is one of two MBTA garages used in operation of the Boston-area trolleybus system (along with the Southampton Garage, where Silver Line dual-mode buses are maintained).

History
The carhouse and yard date to the 1874 construction of a brick building with a clock tower that was constructed by the Union Railway. It remained in use until 1889 when the replacement of horsecars by electric streetcars made the structure obsolete. In 1897, the West End Street Railway constructed a larger structure, which existed for the next forty years until it was demolished in 1937. In 1979, the present structure was constructed to house the trolley buses which became active on the line in 1958.

Future Plans
The MBTA plans to renovate the facility by 2023 to accommodate battery electric buses, eliminating trolleybus operations.

See also
List of Massachusetts Bay Transportation Authority yards

References

Buildings and structures in Cambridge, Massachusetts